Margaret is the only known prograde irregular satellite  of the moons of Uranus.  It was discovered by Scott S. Sheppard, et al. in 2003 and given the provisional designation S/2003 U 3.

Confirmed as Uranus XXIII, it was named after the servant of Hero in William Shakespeare's play Much Ado About Nothing.

Orbit 

Margaret stands out as the only prograde irregular satellite of Uranus. The diagram illustrates the orbital parameters of Margaret, unique  among the irregular satellites of Uranus, with inclination on the vertical axis and the eccentricity of the orbits represented by the segments extending from the pericentre to the apocentre.

Margaret's inclination of 57° is close to the limit of stability. The intermediate inclinations 60 < i < 140 are devoid of known moons due to the Kozai instability. In this instability region, solar perturbations at apoapse cause the moons in this region to acquire large eccentricities that lead to collisions or ejection over 10 million to a billion years.  Margaret's periapsis precession period (Pw) is almost 1.6 million years long. Margaret itself may be ejected from the Uranian system in the far future.

Margaret's orbit is subject to solar and planetary perturbations; thus, its orbital elements are variable over short timescales. Over a timescale of 8,000 years, the average orbital eccentricity of Margaret is 0.68. In 2010, its eccentricity grew to 0.81, temporarily making Margaret with the most eccentric orbit of any moon in the Solar System, though Nereid's average eccentricity of 0.75 is greater.

See also 

 Moons of Uranus

References

External links 
 Margaret Profile by NASA's Solar System Exploration
 David Jewitt pages
  Uranus' Known Satellites (by Scott S. Sheppard)
 Ephemeris IAU-NSES

Moons of Uranus
Irregular satellites
Discoveries by Scott S. Sheppard
20030829
Moons with a prograde orbit